The men's 4 × 400 metres relay event at the 1957 World University Games was held at the Stadium Charlety in Paris with the final on 8 September 1957.

Results

Final

References

Athletics at the 1957 World University Games
1957